"Sparks" is the third single recorded by Barbados-based pop group Cover Drive. The song was released on 29 April 2012 as a digital download in the United Kingdom, taken from their debut album Bajan Style.

Music video
A music video to accompany the release of "Sparks" was first released on YouTube on 16 March 2012 at a total length of three minutes and three seconds.

Critical reception
Lewis Corner of Digital Spy gave the song a positive review stating:

"It's just another night, the boys are getting hype/ But baby in my head, I'm there with you instead," T-Ray bluntly confesses over a clap-happy beat and smooth synths, before Amanda  on a wibbly-lipped chorus that will grab your ears and refuse to let go. With a hook more seductive than a heartthrob vampire, we suspect Cover Drive will have the public under their charms once again. .

Track listing

Chart performance

Weekly charts

Year-end charts

Release history

References

2012 singles
Cover Drive songs
Polydor Records singles
Pop ballads
Songs written by Wayne Hector
Songs written by Steve Mac
Song recordings produced by Steve Mac
2011 songs